Cannon–Brownell–Herrington Farmstead is a historic home and farm located near Johnsonville, Rensselaer County, New York. The original section of the farmhouse was built about 1830, with the central block and wing added about 1870. The house consists of a two-story, central block with flanking 1 1/2-story wings. It has a long woodshed ell, now converted to an apartment. Also on the property are the contributing corn crib (c. 1865-1900), main barn group (c. 1862, 1895, 1960s), and sheep barn (c. 1899).

It was listed on the National Register of Historic Places in 2013.

References

Farms on the National Register of Historic Places in New York (state)
1807 establishments in New York (state)
Houses completed in 1830
Buildings and structures in Rensselaer County, New York
National Register of Historic Places in Rensselaer County, New York